Un Corrido Para la Gente (English: A Ballad for the People) is a sculpture by Carlos Frésquez, installed in Denver, Colorado, U.S.

References

Musical instruments in art
Outdoor sculptures in Denver